"Everyone Can Fly" is a song written and performed by Gigolo Aunts and the title song from their 1999 EP, Everyone Can Fly.  The song, "Everyone Can Fly" also appears on the 1999 Gigolo Aunts album, Minor Chords and Major Themes.  The song is also the featured track on a 1999 promo single.

Track listing
US EP (E Pluribus Unum Recordings) Catalog Number: EPU5P 1032 (1999)

"Everyone Can Fly"  (Gibbs/Hurley)  4:22
"The Shift to Superoverdrive" (Gibbs/Hurley)  3:45
"To Whoever" (Gibbs/Hurley)  4:10
"Sulk with Me" (Gibbs/Hurley)  4:10
"The Big Lie" (Demo)  (Gibbs/Hurley/Basset)  3:31
"Half a Chance" (Live on KCRW)  (Gibbs/Hurley)  2:20

US Promo Single (E Pluribus Unum Recordings) Catalog Number: EPU5P 1030 (15 June 1999)

"Everyone Can Fly"  (Gibbs/Hurley)  4:20

References

1999 EPs
Gigolo Aunts albums